Udetin is a settlement in the Dvor municipality in central Croatia.

References

Populated places in Sisak-Moslavina County